Stephenville Independent School District is a public school district based in Stephenville, Texas (USA).

 In 2022, it received a rating of "A".

Schools
Stephenville High School (Grades 9-12)
Henderson Jr. High School (Grades 7-8)
Gilbert Intermediate School (Grades 5-6)
Hook Elementary School (Grades 3-4)
Chamberlin Elementary School (Grades 1-2)
Central Elementary School (Grades PK-K)

References

External links
Stephenville ISD

School districts in Erath County, Texas